Matthew Campbell Barnes (born 7 May 1973) is a British businessman, and the Chief Executive of Aldi UK & Ireland. He joined Aldi in 1997 as a graduate.

See also
 Christian Härtnagel, UK Managing Director of Lidl
 List of supermarket chains in the United Kingdom

References

External links
 Aldi UK

1973 births
Living people
Alumni of the University of Liverpool
British retail chief executives
People from Bath, Somerset